Step Out of Clé is a single album by South Korean boy band Stray Kids. It was released digitally on January 24, 2020, through JYP Entertainment. It consists of English versions of the Clé: Levanter songs–"Double Knot" and "Levanter"–in support of the United States leg of their first concert tour District 9: Unlock World Tour.

Release and promotion

On January 10, 2020, Stray Kids posted a photo on their social media, depicting the members standing back and the background of a traditional Korean palace with the text "2020. 1. 24 Coming soon". Four days later, they announced the single Step Out of Clé, which would be released on January 24, alongside its cover artwork. It contains two tracks of the singles "Double Knot", and "Levanter" from the group's fifth extended play Clé: Levanter sung in English. The group uploaded the group promotional image on January 17, depicting the members in student uniform but untieing the tie, and making up with the scratch. The teaser video for "Double Knot (English ver.)" was uploaded on January 21, and its performance video on the same day as Step Out of Clé release at 14:00 KST or 0:00 ET.

To promote Step Out of Clé and their first world tour District 9: Unlock, Stray Kids appeared in the U.S. morning shows Live with Kelly and Ryan on January 27, 2020, and Good Day New York the next day, to perform the English version of "Levanter", and "Double Knot", respectively.

Commercial performance

Upon Step Out of Clé release, "Double Knot" and "Levanter" re-entered the Billboard World Digital Song Sales, dated at February 8, 2020, at number six and five, respectively.

Track listing

Notes

  signifies an English lyricist.

Credits and personnel

Musicians
 Stray Kids – vocals
 Bang Chan (3Racha) – background vocals , lyrics , English lyrics , composition , arrangement 
 Changbin (3Racha) – background vocals , lyrics , composition 
 Han (3Racha) – background vocals , lyrics , composition 
 Hyunjin – background vocals 
 Seungmin – background vocals 
 J.Y. Park "The Asiansoul" – lyrics 
 Herz Analog – lyrics 
 Sophia Pae – English lyrics 
 Nick Furlong – composition , all instruments 
 DallasK – composition , arrangement , all instruments 
 Hong Ji-sang – composition , arrangement , all instruments , keyboard , electric guitar 

Technical
 Choi Hye-jin – recording 
 Nick Furlong – instrument recording 
 DallasK – instrument recording 
 Distract – vocal direction 
 Jang Han-soo – vocal editing 
 Lee Tae-sub – mixing 
 Ken Lewis – mixing 
 Park Jeong-eon – mastering 
 Chris Gehringer – mastering 
 Will Quinnell – assistant 

Locations
 JYP Studios – recording, mixing 
 Westlake Studios – instrument recording 
 Honey Butter Studio – mastering 
 Sterling Sound – mastering

Release history

References

2020 EPs
2020 singles
JYP Entertainment EPs
JYP Entertainment singles
Single albums
Stray Kids EPs